The 2008 BYU Cougars football team represented Brigham Young University in the 2008 NCAA Division I FBS football season.

Prior to the 2008 season, BYU had won consecutive Mountain West Conference (MWC) championship titles without losing a conference game.  It had also finished with an 11-2 overall record for consecutive seasons.  The Cougars have won four MWC championships since the league began in 1999 (Co-Champions with CSU and Utah in 1999, and sole Champions in 2001, 2006 and 2007), and 23 conference titles overall. BYU ended last season ranked 14th in the nation in the major polls, one of its best finishes in the last two decades.

BYU was selected to win the MWC according to the conference's annual media poll.

The Cougars made their fourth consecutive post-season appearance in the Las Vegas Bowl at Sam Boyd Stadium in Las Vegas, Nevada, losing to the Arizona Wildcats Football 31-21.  BYU beat the Oregon Ducks in 2006 and the UCLA Bruins in 2007.  BYU lost to the California Golden Bears in the 2005 game.

BYU played its home games at LaVell Edwards Stadium, named after its former coach, LaVell Edwards.

Pre-season
Spring Practice started March 17 and ended April 12 with the annual Blue/White game.

Fall camp began on August 1 with actual practices starting on August 4.  Camp ended August 20 with a final scrimmage.  Preparation for the first game began on August 22.

BYU begins the season ranked #17 in the USA Today Coaches Poll and #16 in the AP Poll.

David Nixon and Jan Jorgensen for the defense and Max Hall and Travis Bright for the offense were chosen by their teammates as captains for the 2008 season.

Rankings

Preseason rankings
In the pre-season, the Cougars were ranked #19 and then later #14 by ESPN's Mark Schlabach, #12 by Rivals.com David Fox and Steve Megargee, #22 by College Football News, #17 by Stewart Mandel of CNN's SI.com (Sports Illustrated), #12 by Lindy's, #14 by CBS Sportsline, #13 by Tony Barnhart (a.k.a. "Mr. College Football") of the Atlanta Constitution-Journal, #14 by Athlon Sports, #17 by Phil Steele, #16 by CBS College Sport's Adam Caparell, and #10 by New York Times' Paul Myerberg.  They started the season ranked 17th in the Coaches Poll (with 547 votes), and ranked 16th in the AP Poll (with 590 votes).

MountainWest Sports Network
Early in 2008, DirecTV agreed to distribute the MountainWest Sports Network (The mtn.) nationally on its satellite system beginning August 27, 2008 on channel 616.  National satellite distribution was the MWC's primary media goal for the previous two years.  The mtn. was the first regional sports network dedicated solely to a college conference's sports. In 2004, CSTV (now called CBS Sports Network) was originally designated as the channel for carrying MWC sports, but it was later announced that The mtn., would carry primarily coverage of the MWC.  Over time The mtn. was rolled out in various cable markets.  On February 21, 2008, San Diego State University Athletic Director, Jeff Schemmel, stated in a media conference that a deal had been struck to broadcast the mtn on DirecTV beginning in August.  Spokesmen for the MWC, the mtn. and DirecTV confirmed this the following day.  The mtn. will be available on DirecTV as a regular channel in each market in the MWC footprint.  In other areas, it will be available on DirecTV's Sports Pack package.  Although the Dallas–Fort Worth Metroplex is within the Mountain West Conference footprint with TCU's presence in Fort-Worth, Charter Communications and Time Warner Cable companies are the only cable companies in the Mountain West Conference footprint who have failed to pick up The mtn on their channel line-up.

Schedule

Game summaries

Northern Iowa

This was BYU's first-ever game against the University of Northern Iowa Panthers from the Division I FCS.  In recent years the Panthers have proven to be a perennial top program in FCS football.  Last year Northern Iowa (UNI) was ranked No. 1 in the FCS until a loss to Delaware in the FCS playoffs.  UNI was ranked #3 in the 2008 FCS preseason poll.  The Panthers agreed to play BYU at the last minute after Nevada backed out of its agreement to play BYU in 2008.  Northern Iowa ended the 2007 season with a considerably stronger Sagarin rating than Nevada and finished #4 in the FCS.

In a very physical game from both teams, the Cougars jumped out to a wide early lead of 27-3 at the half.  The Panthers could not stop the Cougar offense from driving the field.  Despite an ugly, scoreless, third quarter for BYU, which included four fumbles, the Cougars pulled away again in the fourth quarter to defeat the Panthers 41-17 in front of a sold-out crowd in Provo.  BYU's Dennis Pitta caught eleven passes for 213 yards and Max Hall threw with an 83% completion for 486 yards, two touchdowns and no interceptions.  Pitta lead the nation in receiving yards and Max was second in the nation for passing yards with a 198.6 rating.  On the defensive end, junior college transfer Coleby Clawson made his hard hitting debut, knocking out UNI's quarterback Pat Grace three times.  Justin Sorensen put all seven kickoffs into the end zone.

With the exception of three big plays, UNI's offense struggled against BYU's defense, but UNI capitalized on the turnovers in the third quarter to earn both of its touchdowns.  UNI quarterback, Pat Grace, broke through for a 69-yard gain that resulted in a field goal.  The play after recovering a BYU fumble, UNI ran a reverse with wide receiver, Victor Williams, making a 76-yard touchdown pass.  UNI's final score came on a blind-side, forced fumble against Max Hall in the end zone.

David Tafuna carried the team flag onto the field, and LaVell Edwards carried the alumni flag on to the field.

Washington

    
    
    
    
    
    
    

BYU and Washington met for the seventh time.  This was BYU's first win in a non-conference road game since 2002.  The last meeting with the Huskies was in 1999, when BYU won in Provo 35-28.  Washington marred what would have been a perfect season for BYU in 1996.  BYU went on to finish #5 in the country with a 14-1 record, winning 13 regular season games, an NCAA record that still stands.

The Cougars had to contain the Huskies' athletic quarterback, Jake Locker, who ran for nearly 1,000 yards last season.  BYU held Locker below his rushing average to 62 yards on 18 attempts.  Locker completed only 17 of his 32 passes for 204 yards.  Washington had 337 yards of total offense to BYU's 475.

BYU only punted twice in the game.  After driving the length of the field again, BYU looked to take the lead early in the fourth quarter when Harvey Unga, who rushed for 136 yards in the game, fumbled the ball at the goal line which was recovered by Washington.

The Cougars won the game by blocking a Washington PAT attempt in the fourth quarter. With 2 seconds left in regulation, the 35-yard extra-point kick by Huskies' Ryan Perkins was blocked by Jan Jorgensen.  The PAT was moved back 15 yards on an unsportsmanlike penalty on Locker when he tossed the ball in the air after running the ball in for a touchdown.  Two of the last three games BYU has played, they won the game by blocking a last second kick.

Max Hall was named Mountain West Conference Offensive Player of the Week.  Hall hit 31 of 40 pass attempts for 338 yards passing and three touchdowns, including a 15-yarder to tight end Dennis Pitta with 3:31 left.

Jan Jorgensen's game winning block was the ESPN Pontiac Game Changing Performance for the week.

Washington Leads series 4-3

UCLA

    
    
    
    
    
    
    
    
    

UCLA offensive coordinator, Norm Chow (former OC at BYU), and UCLA quarterback, Ben Olson (former BYU player) came back to Provo for the 10th meeting between the Bruins and BYU.  The teams faced off twice during the 2007 season.  The Cougars defeated UCLA in the 2007 Las Vegas Bowl after the Bruins won a close regular-season meeting. Ben Olson did not play due to injuries.

Kellen Fowler carried the team flag onto the field, and Vai Sikahema carried the alumni flag on to the field.

BYU scored first on a Max Hall pass to Dennis Pitta for 10 yards for a touchdown; Hall then passed to Austin Collie for another score (2 yards). The Cougars recovered a fumble and scored on the next play to take a 21-0 lead. After another Bruins fumble, Hall passed to Michael Reed for another touchdown. Another Bruins fumble gave Hall his 5th pass touchdown in the first half. Hall's 6th touchdown pass was thrown to Pitta.

In the second half, Max Hall passed to Harvey Unga for a 6-yard touchdown, Mitch Payne kicked a 24-yard field goal and Wayne Latu rushed for a 13-yard touchdown to give BYU the 59-0 win.  UCLA's worst loss in nearly 80 years.

Given the injuries to BYU's linebackers since fall camp through the first two games, BYU added a nickel package to its defense that proved to be effective.

So far BYU is 16-18 for scoring in the "Blue Zone" including 15 for touchdowns and its first field goal attempt for the season in the UCLA game.  BYU's 2 failures were both fumbles, one at the goal line against Washington that rolled in for a touchback.

BYU has no 100-yard rushers against it, and leads the nation in third down conversions to this point.

For the second week in a row, Max Hall was named the MWC Offensive Player of the Week and the Walter Camp Football Foundation's Offensive Player of the Week.  Hall broke the BYU record of passing touchdowns during a half with 6 and tied the BYU record for passing touchdowns at 7.

This was the worst loss the Bruins endured since a 76-0 defeat in the very first UCLA–USC rivalry football game in 1929.

 UCLA Leads series 7-3

Wyoming

    
    
    
    
    
    
    

This was the 73rd game between Wyoming and BYU.  The Cougars have won their last five games against Wyoming by an average of almost 24 points.

BYU allowed Wyoming's offense to move early, but on the Cowboys' first drive the Cougar defense picked up a dropped lateral pass, returning it for six points.  BYU's offense started slow, but ended up scoring frequently in the second quarter.  The Cougar defense stepped up and held Wyoming to zero points in all four quarters, leading to the second straight shutout, the first consecutive shutout in twenty three years.

David Oswald carried the team flag onto the field, and Ty Detmer carried the alumni flag on to the field.  David Nixon, who returned an interception 19 yards for a touchdown, was honored as the MWC Defensive Player of the Week.  C.J. Santiago was named as the MWC Special Teams Player of the Week.  Santiago had seven punts for an average of 46.7 yards per kick, including a season high punt for 61 yards. His first three punts were all downed inside the Wyoming 20-yard line: the first at the 11, the second at the 5 and the third at the 4-yard line.

BYU Leads series 40-30-3

Utah State

    
    
    
    
    
    
    
    

This was the 78th game between the Utah State Aggies and BYU.  The annual winner of this interstate contest is awarded The Old Wagon Wheel.  The Aggies have not beaten BYU since 1993.  BYU defeated Utah State 38-0 in their last meeting in 2006.

The Cougars started fast in the first quarter with a 76-yard touchdown pass, followed by a 35-yard fumble recovery for a touchdown, a field goal, and then an interception resulting in another touchdown.  Hall completed 23 of 47 passes for 303 yards, 2 touchdowns and 2 interceptions.  Unga rushed 21 times for 86 yards and a touchdown.  Collie added 8 receptions for 132 yards and 2 touchdowns.

BYU was plagued with penalties particularly in the last quarter.  They had 12 penalties for 123 yards with several personal fouls including an unnecessary roughness penalty by Max Hall.

The Aggie's mobile quarterback, Diondre Borel, and speedy running back, Robert Turbin, gave the Cougars some trouble rushing for a combined 117 yards including a 40-yard break-away run for a touchdown by Turbin early in the fourth quarter.

BYU Leads series 42-33-3

New Mexico

    
    
    
    

This was the 58th game between New Mexico and BYU.  The Cougars have won four games in a row against the Lobos.

BYU entertained a 3-3 New Mexico squad at the midway point of the seasion as chilly October afternoon air settled in Provo. The Cougars held a 15-game winning streak and survived their lowest-scoring game thus far in 2008 to remain unbeaten on homecoming. New Mexico opened the scoring with a short field goal early in the second quarter after the teams traded four punts. Austin Collie sparked the BYU offense with a 58-yard reception on a streak down the sideline and Max Hall found tight end Andrew George in the back of the end zone to take a 7-3 lead. Kicker Justin Sorensen missed a 50-yard field goal before halftime, but Max Hall and George linked up for another score again in the third quarter to extend the lead to 14-3. The Lobos looked to score with 7:14 left in the game to trim the lead, but an illegal block wiped out the touchdown and the drive stalled. The Cougars responded with a 12-play 76-yard drive ending with an 8-yard scoring reception by Collie to seal the game, 21-3. Hall threw for 258 yards and three touchdowns, while Collie finished with nine receptions for 155 yards and a score.

BYU Leads series 43-14-1

TCU

    
    
    
    
    
    
    

This was the 8th game between TCU and BYU, played on a Thursday night for the third straight year.

This was the first loss for the BYU Football program since the 2007 setback against Tulsa.  TCU Head Coach Gary Patterson had said this was a game his program was pointing towards since January of that year.
BYU trails the series 5-6

UNLV

    
    
    
    
    
    
    
    
    
    
    
    

This was the 16th game between UNLV and BYU.

BYU Leads series 13-3

Colorado State

    
    
    
    
    
    
    
    
    
    
    
    
    

This was the 67th game between Colorado State and BYU.

BYU Leads series 36-27-3

San Diego State

    
    
    
    
    
    
    
    
    
    

This was the 33rd game between San Diego State and BYU.  It was "Senior Day" for BYU, and in honor of the occasion, the field had a different look then usual.  The endzones were painted in blue, along with the 50-yard line logo.  That too, was filled in with blue.

BYU Leads Series 25-7-1

Air Force

    
    
    
    
    
    
    
    
    
    

This was the 29th game between Air Force and BYU.  BYU has won the last 5 games against the Falcons.

BYU Leads series 23-6

Utah

    
    
    
    
    
    
    
    
    
    
    
    

This is an annual rivalry game unofficially dubbed "Holy War."  Along with Utah State, these teams also compete annually for the "Beehive Boot."  This game is typically the most anticipated of the season for BYU and its fans. In November 2005, The Wall Street Journal ranked the BYU–Utah football rivalry as the fourth-best college football rivalry game in the country.  This will be the 84th game between the teams dating back to 1922. Utah dominated the series 34-2-4 through 1964. Since that time BYU has led the series 28-16.  The Cougars were throttled in a 48-24 defeat against the Utes.  It was the largest margin of victory since 2004 when the Cougars lost to the Utes 52-21.  The rivalry is known for close, exciting finishes.  Since 1993, the margin of victory has been seven points or less in all but three games.  At stake is the MWC championship, Utah's winning streak (longest in the nation), and a BCS Bowl berth.

Utah leads Series 53-33-4

Las Vegas Bowl: Arizona

    
    
    
    
    
    
    
    

BYU became bowl eligible by finishing the season with a strong 10-2 record.  On December 7, the Cougars were officially invited to the Las Vegas Bowl for the fourth consecutive year.  On December 20, 2008, BYU played the Arizona Wildcats who finished fifth in the Pac-10 conference with a 7-5 record. The Cougars lost the game, 31-21, to finish the season with a 10-3 record.

Coaching and player changes
Jaime Hill was promoted to defensive coordinator on January 10. Prior to this, Bronco Mendenhall was acting as both head coach and defensive coordinator.  Mendenhall has retained responsibility for play-calling during games.

Vic So'oto moved from tight end to outside linebacker as a starter.  Daniel Sorensen, a safety, also moved to outside linebacker.

Coaching staff

Players
The 14 returning starters from last season are Max Hall (quarterback), Harvey Unga (tail back), Austin Collie and Michael Reed (wide receivers), Dennis Pitta (tight end), Travis Bright and Ray Feinga (offensive guards), Dallas Reynolds and David Oswald (offensive tackles), Jan Jorgensen and Ian Dulan (defensive ends), Russell Tialavea (nose tackle), David Nixon (linebacker), and Kellen Fowler (free safety).  Bryce Mahuika also returns as a slot back and kick holder. Experienced lettermen starting this year include: Fui Vakapuna (fullback), Matt Bauman, Shawn Doman, and Coleby Clawson (linebackers), Brandon Howard (field corner), and David Tafuna (strong safety).

Statistical Leaders
 
As of November 15, 2008

Passing

Rushing

Receiving

Defense

Injuries and Suspensions
Russell Tialavea (nose tackle) and David Tafuna (strong safety) are recovered from their injuries suffered during the 2007 preseason.  Both Travis Bright (right guard) and Garret Reden (reserve left guard) have recovered from their broken leg injuries.  Bright holds the title of the team's strongest man aka Strong Man On Campus (SMOC): he holds the football team's school record for bench press (540 pounds) from his workout this summer, and the team record for the hang clean lift (434 pounds).

Terrance Hooks, a reserve inside linebacker, tore his patella tendon during Spring practice and underwent surgery the following day.  He has missed most of the 2008 season.

In late spring, senior fullback Manase Tonga was ruled to be academically ineligible for the 2008 season, and was suspended from school.  Tonga may re-apply for admission in October for the 2009 Winter Semester.

Just prior to Fall Camp Grant Nelson, a backup for outside linebacker behind Vic So'oto, had two surgeries related to kidney problems and will miss the 2008 season.  Austin Collie, starting wide receiver, had limited participation in Fall Camp while recovering from a stress facture in his lower leg.  Matt Bauman, starting inside linebacker, missed the beginning of camp while he recovered from a foot injury suffered in a scooter accident.

Projected starting center, Tom Sorensen, had limited participation in camp with a shoulder problem.  After attempting a moderate treatment, he opted for surgery and will miss 4 to 6 weeks to recover.

Dan Van Sweden, reserve inside linebacker, broke his leg during camp and will be out 8 to 10 weeks.

In the third week of camp, Kelly Bills, reserve fullback, quit as a player after suffering his fourth concussion, but was enthused to stay on as a graduate assistant for the team.

Starting fullback, Fui Vakapuna, missed the first game against Northern Iowa due to an academic issue which he resolved that week.

Vic So'oto, starting outside linebacker, broke his foot in the first half in the game against Washington and is expected to be out for about 5 to 8 weeks.

Michael Reed, starting wide receiver, injured his knee in the Wyoming game and was out for 3 weeks before returning for the New Mexico game.

G. Pittman became academically ineligible under team rules about mid-season and chose to transfer to Washington State.

Scott Johnson suffered an unlikely double groin tear in the Colorado State game and was out for the rest of the season.

Players' backgrounds
Because BYU is sponsored by the Church of Jesus Christ of Latter-day Saints (LDS Church), many of the team members are Latter-day Saints (LDS) commonly referred to as Mormons.  Because of this religious and cultural affiliation, many of the team members have served a two-year proselyting mission (often in a foreign country, speaking the native language), are married, and sometimes have children.  Because of missions the average age of the team is often slightly higher than other college football teams.  The effect of a mission is believed to be both an advantage and a disadvantage.  It is an advantage in that the players can be either more physically developed, or more intellectually or emotionally mature.  It is a disadvantage in that the player often returns from the mission grossly under-conditioned and out of practice.  A player often redshirts his first year back from his mission.

Because of the long-standing ties of the LDS Church in Polynesia, many football players are also Polynesian.  Bryce Mahuika, for example, is Māori, and he introduced the tradition of the team performing the Haka in 2005.

Of the players participating in 2008 fall Camp, 60 served a two-year mission and 42 speak a second language. Sixteen players speak Spanish, twelve speak Tongan, eight speak Portuguese, two speak German, and one each speaks Mandarin Chinese, French, Haitian Creole, and Tagalog.  There are 27 married players.  The most recent newlywed, Dennis Pitta, married quarterback Max Hall's sister-in-law.

Roster

Depth chart
Edit

Recruits
Recruits joining the team this year include O'Neill Chambers and Justin Sorensen.  Justin Sorensen was widely regarded as the best high school football kicker in the country last year with a record high 62-yard field goal and kickoffs that regularly go into the endzone and often through the goal posts.

Awards and citations

Outland Trophy
Senior offensive linemen, Ray Feinga and Dallas Reynolds, were named to the 2008 Outland Trophy watch list. BYU boasts two previous Outland Trophy winners, defensive lineman Jason Buck (1986) and offensive lineman Mohammed Elewonibi (1989).

Lott Trophy
Jan Jorgensen was selected as a preseason candidate for the Lott Trophy's Defensive IMPACT Player of the Year.  He is one of 42 preseason candidates being considered for the award.

Bronko Nagurski Trophy
Jan Jorgensen was named to the preseason watch list for the Bronko Nagurski Trophy which is awarded to the best defensive player in college football.

Ted Hendricks Award
Jan Jorgensen is also a candidate for the Ted Hendricks Award presented to the premier defensive end in college football.

Chuck Bednarik Award
Jan Jorgensen is a candidate for the Chuck Bednarik Award.

Maxwell Award
Junior quarterback, Max Hall, was named on the preseason watch list for the Maxwell Award, given to the year's best college football player.  Ty Detmer won the award at BYU in 1990.

Davey O'Brien Award
Max Hall is one of thirty-one quarterbacks named to the Davey O'Brien National Quarterback Award watch list.  The award honors the nation's best quarterback.  Jim McMahon, Steve Young, and Ty Detmer (twice) have all won the award.  Honored four times, BYU has earned more Davey O' Brien Awards than any other team.

Walter Camp Award
Max Hall was one of 35 candidates named on the watch list for the Walter Camp Award for the Player-of-the-Year.  In his first year as a starter in 2007, Hall was the nation's top sophomore quarterback in terms of passing yards. On the season, he completed 298-of-496 passes for 3,848 yards and 26 touchdowns.

John Mackey Award
Dennis Pitta is one of thirty tight ends named to the John Mackey Award preseason watch list.

Fred Biletnikoff Award
Junior Austin Collie is on the watch list for the Fred Biletnikoff Award.

Dick Butkus Award
Senior outside linebacker, David Nixon, is on the watch list for the Dick Butkus Award.

Doak Walker Award
Sophomore Harvey Unga is one of 42 of the nation's top college running backs named as a candidate for the Doak Walker Award.  Luke Staley won the award at BYU in 2001.

All-America Team
Candidates for the All-America team are Ray Feinga, Dallas Reynolds, Jan Jorgensen, Max Hall, Harvey Unga, Dennis Pitta and Austin Collie.  Fifty-three BYU players have earned 59 All-America citations including 11 consensus All-Americans and 21 Academic All-America citations.  Harvey Unga earned Freshman All-America accolades last year.

All-Mountain West Conference Football Team (Pre-season)

First Team Offense: Max Hall, Harvey Unga, Austin Collie, Dennis Pitta, Ray Feinga, and Dallas ReynoldsFirst Team Defense: Jan JorgensenSecond Team Offense:Second Team Defense:Offensive Player of the Year: Max HallHonorable Mention:

References

BYU Cougars
BYU Cougars football seasons
BYU